Mackay College is a secondary school located in Nateete, one of Kampala's suburbs, in Lubaga Division, Kampala District, Uganda. It is 8 km from the city centre, off Masaka road, within the vicinity of Mackay Church of Uganda Natete in Natete Church Zone.

The school operates a small piggery where pupils learn to care for domestic pigs, students are trained how to grow vegetables( without using artificial fertilizers) through the organic farming project led by the biology teacher Migadde Jane. Other projects run by the school, such as briquette making, seek to produce self-reliant and self-employed students in order to curb unemployment in the area.

History
The school was founded in 1967 on private basis and later became government aided in 1980. It is a Mixed Day 'O' and 'A' level secondary school and currently, it has a population of approx. 1100 students.

The school is named after Alexander Murdoch Mackay, a missionary, a teacher and an engineer who contributed tremendously to Christianity and education in Uganda.

Mackay Memorial College has been the recipient of multiple grants from the TEAA (Teachers for East Africa Alumni) totally $4400. It has been allocated for computers, instructor education, books, and a computing environment. Individuals within the organization have donated tuition money for students as well as computers.

Notable alumni
Esta Nambayo, lawyer and judge

References

External links
Mackay Memorial College

Educational institutions established in 1967
Schools in Uganda
Education in Kampala